The Dougherty County School System is the school district in Dougherty County, Georgia, United States (county seat Albany, Georgia). A total of 16,844 students attend 14 elementary schools, four middle schools, three high schools, and one alternative school.

The system is governed by a seven-member school board and an administrative staff. The school board consists of six members elected from geographical school districts and one at-large member. The administrative staff consists of Superintendent Kenneth Dyer.

Schools

Elementary schools
 Alice Coachman Elementary School
 International Studies Elementary Charter School 
 Robert Harvey Elementary School (formerly Jackson Heights Elementary School)
 Lake Park Elementary School
 Lamar Reese School of the Arts
 Lincoln Elementary Magnet School
 Live Oak Elementary School
 Martin Luther King, Jr. Elementary School
 Morningside Elementary School
 Northside Elementary School
 Radium Springs Elementary School
 Sherwood Acres Elementary School
 Turner Elementary School
 West Town Elementary School

Middle schools
 Albany Middle School
 Merry Acres Middle School
 Radium Springs Middle School
 Robert A. Cross Middle Magnet School

High schools

 Dougherty Comprehensive High School
 Monroe Comprehensive High School
 Westover Comprehensive High School

Other schools
 College and Career Performance Learning Center (CCPLC)
 Commodore Conyers College and Career Academy (4C Academy)
 Highland Alternative School
 L.I.F.E. Lab  (Learning in a Flexible Environment: Gifted Education)
 Oak Tree
 Phoenix School of Achievement

References

External links
 Dougherty County School System

School districts in Georgia (U.S. state)
Education in Dougherty County, Georgia